Raymond Pitman (born 5 August 1951 ) is a sailor from Bermuda, who represented his country at the 1976 Summer Olympics in Kingston, Ontario, Canada as crew member in the Soling. With helmsman Richard Belvin and fellow crew member Gordon Flood they took the 21st place.

References

Living people
1951 births
Sailors at the 1976 Summer Olympics – Soling
Olympic sailors of Bermuda
Bermudian male sailors (sport)